This is a list of Bengali language films released in India in the year 2016.

Box office collection

January–March

April–June

July–September

October–December

References 

Bengali
Bengali
 
2016